The Border Guard Command, commonly known as FARAJA Border Guard, is a subdivision of the Law Enforcement Force (FARAJA) and Iran's sole agency that performs border guard and border control duties for land borders, and coast guard duties for maritime borders. The unit was founded in 2000. Between 1991 and 2000, border control was the responsibility of the Security deputy of FARAJA. Prior to 1991, border control was the responsibility of the Gendarmerie.

References 

2000 establishments in Iran
Iran
Specialist law enforcement agencies of Iran
Government agencies established in 2000
Law Enforcement Command of Islamic Republic of Iran